Anand Sagar Lake, also known as Bai Talaab is an artificial lake in present-day Banswara district, Rajasthan. It was constructed by Jagmal Singh of Banswara for his Queen Lanchi Bai.

Tourist attractions
The lake side is adorned by rows of kalpavriksha trees and also has chhatris or cenotaphs related to other rulers of the state of Banswara.

References

Lakes of Rajasthan